Half Moon Run is a Canadian indie rock band based in Montreal, Quebec. The group is known for their heavy use of layered percussion, group vocal harmonies, and for playing multiple instruments during live performances.

Career

2009–2013: Formation and Dark Eyes
Half Moon Run was formed in 2009 in Montreal's Mile End neighbourhood by Conner Molander and Dylan Phillips, who had both moved to Montreal from Vancouver. They posted an ad on Craigslist that said they were looking for a bassist and/or a drummer. The ad caught the attention of Devon Portielje, originally from Ottawa. Despite not being a bassist or a drummer, he got in touch with Molander and Phillips who agreed to let him join.

Their debut album, Dark Eyes, was released on 27 March 2012, with "Full Circle" being released on 19 March as the lead single. The entire album was co-produced with Daniel Lagacé and Nygel Asselin. They toured Europe, Australia and North America. Critical acclaim has included praise for their three-part harmonies.

Shortly after the release of Dark Eyes, Isaac Symonds, originally from Comox, British Columbia, joined the lineup.

Throughout 2012 and 2013, the band played at numerous music festivals including South by Southwest, Osheaga, Canadian Music Week, Glastonbury, WayHome Music & Arts Festival, and opened for artists such as Of Monsters and Men, Metric, Patrick Watson, City and Colour, and Mumford & Sons.

In August 2013, "Full Circle" was featured in a trailer for Ubisoft's Assassin's Creed IV: Black Flag. The song "Unofferable" also appears on an episode of the CBS's show Elementary as a backtracking to a scene.

2014–2019: Sun Leads Me On and A Blemish in the Great Light
In July 2014, they announced that work on their second album had begun. They announced that it would be released in fall 2015. That same year, they were the recipients of the International Achievement Award at the annual Francophone SOCAN Awards in Montreal.

On 24 July 2015, the band announced a European tour that included shows in the United Kingdom, France, Ireland, Belgium, Germany and the Netherlands.

On 7 August 2015, the band announced, via their Twitter page, the release of their second studio album, Sun Leads Me On, on 23 October 2015. They simultaneously released a teaser track, "Trust", which was available as a free download with pre-orders of their album. Pre-orders via their website offered the album signed by all band members. A deluxe version was also released.

On 1 November 2019, Half Moon Run released their third full-length album A Blemish in the Great Light. The album won Adult Alternative Album of the Year at the Juno Awards of 2020.

2020–2022: Symonds's Departure, The Covideo Sessions and subsequent releases
On 25 May 2020, the band announced that Isaac Symonds would be leaving the group.

Throughout May and June 2020 while the band members had been self-isolating due to the COVID-19 pandemic, they recorded and released videos of themselves performing together via video conference. Symonds remained with the group throughout this time. That same year, they also released seven new singles, six of which were then released together as an EP entitled Seasons of Change on 17 July. They followed up in September with The Covideo Sessions, an album featuring the recordings of their May–June video performances.

On 21 August 2020, Dylan Phillips released his debut solo EP entitled Undercurrents.

On 18 March 2021, the band released a single, "How Come My Body", to promote their Inwards & Onwards EP which was released on 18 June 2021.

On 26 December 2021, Half Moon Run released Seasons of Change and Inwards & Onwards together on a compilation album.

On 10 March 2022, the band released "Fatal Line", a song they contributed to The 1969 Record. The album also featured songs from Louis-Jean Cormier, Elisapie, Les Soeurs Boulay, Jason Bajada, and Matt Holubowski.

2023–present: You Can Let Go and 4th album 
On 3 March 2023, the band released a single, "You Can Let Go." On the same day, the band announced that they signed to BMG, as well as a tour for Europe and North America.

Members

Current
Devon Portielje – lead vocals, guitar, piano, percussion (2009–present)
Conner Molander – backing vocals, guitar, keyboard, piano, pedal steel, bass, harmonica (2009–present)
Dylan Phillips – backing vocals, drums, piano, keyboard (2009–present)

Former
Isaac Symonds – backing vocals, drums, mandolin, synthesizer, bass (2012–2020)

Discography

Albums

Live albums

Compilations

EPs

Singles

Other charted songs

Music Videos

References

External links
 Official site
 

Musical groups from Montreal
Canadian musical trios
Canadian indie rock groups
Musical groups established in 2009
Canadian indie folk groups
2009 establishments in Quebec
Juno Award for Adult Alternative Album of the Year winners
Glassnote Records artists
Félix Award winners